Sarah Kimmins is a Canadian scientist whose research explores the role of epigenetics in germ cell (i.e. sperm and oocyte) development, fertility and offspring health. She is an Associate Professor in reproductive biology at McGill University's Department of Animal Science, and a Canada Research Chair (Tier 1) in Epigenetics, Reproduction and Development.

Education 
Kimmins completed a Bachelor of Science, Master of Science and a PhD (2003) at Dalhousie University.

Career 
Kimmins' research in mice has demonstrated that nutritional deficiencies in paternal diet lead to a higher rate of birth defects in offspring, raising concerns that a human father’s diet before conception may play an important role in a child’s health. For HISTurn (a project which aims to diagnose male infertility), Kimmins received $25,000 as part of the Prelaunch category in the McGill Innovation Fund (MIF) competition. She has previously spoken about male infertility for various media outlets, including CBC News and Vox.

KShe has published over 100 academic publications, resulting in over 4,400 citations, and an h-index and i10-index of 29 and 44 respectively.

Awards 
Kimmins has received The Society for the Study of Reproduction's Young Investigator Award (2016) and the American Society of Andrology's Young Andrologist Award (2014).

Selected academic publications 

 Chromatin remodelling and epigenetic features of germ cells. S Kimmins and P Sassone-Corsi. Nature 434 (7033), 583-589.
 The chromatoid body of male germ cells: similarity with processing bodies and presence of Dicer and microRNA pathway components. N Kotaja, SN Bhattacharyya, L Jaskiewicz, S Kimmins, M Parvinen et al. Proceedings of the National Academy of Sciences 103 (8), 2647-2652.
 miRNet-dissecting miRNA-target interactions and functional associations through network-based visual analysis. Y Fan, K Siklenka, SK Arora, P Ribeiro, S Kimmins, and J Xia. Nucleic Acids Research 44 (W1), W135-W141.
 Effect of interferon-τ on prostaglandin biosynthesis, transport, and signaling at the time of maternal recognition of pregnancy in cattle: evidence of polycrine actions of Prostaglandin E2. JA Arosh, SK Banu, S Kimmins, P Chapdelaine, LA Maclaren, and MA Fortier. Endocrinology 145 (11), 5280-5293.

References 

Epigeneticists
Dalhousie University alumni
Year of birth missing (living people)
Living people
21st-century Canadian biologists
Academic staff of McGill University